Charles Ira Fabian (born 3 June 1964) is an Antiguan former cyclist. He competed in the sprint event at the 1988 Summer Olympics.

References

External links
 

1964 births
Living people
Antigua and Barbuda male cyclists
Olympic cyclists of Antigua and Barbuda
Cyclists at the 1988 Summer Olympics
Place of birth missing (living people)